KRE-O is a line of construction toys (similar to Lego and Mega Bloks) manufactured by South Korea-based Oxford and marketed by Hasbro. Kre-O was released in stores in Fall 2011. The name Kre-O comes from the Latin word creo, which means "I create".

Kre-O toys feature highly articulated humanoid figures called "Kreons". Kre-O blocks are compatible with Lego bricks and Lego minifigures, hence also compatible with Mega Bloks and other building block brands.

Toy lines
Kre-O Transformers is the first line of the Kre-O series. They were first shown in February  2011 at the American International Toy Fair trade show in New York. Transformers Kre-O figures include homages to their live action film, Timelines, Transformers: Prime and Beast Hunters sub-lines.

Kre-O G.I. Joe was released as the third Kre-O line in February 2013 as a Toys "R" Us exclusive. This collection is based primarily on Hasbro's G.I.Joe: A Real American Hero toy line, cartoons, and comic book series, but includes some Adventure Team Kreons as well.

Kre-O Star Trek was released as the fourth line of Kre-O sets in April 2013.  The initial sets and Kreons are based on the 2009 reboot and its sequel Star Trek Into Darkness. A preview trailer was posted by Hasbro, first on Facebook, then later on YouTube. The trailer re-enacts the original "teaser trailer" for the first film, showing the construction of the U.S.S. Enterprise in Kre-O form and by Kreon construction workers. A press release made at the 2012 New York Toy Fair showed the completed Enterprise model (complete with flip-up "saucer" showing the ship's Bridge) and Kreons of Kirk, Spock and Sulu.

At ComiCon International 2013, Hasbro announced new brand lines for Dungeons & Dragons and Cityville Invasion plus additional building sets for Star Trek, GI Joe and Transformers brand lines.
Kre-O Cityville Invasion is the fifth line of Kre-O sets, based on the popular CityVille online game series. This line introduces "Sonic Motion Technology", which triggers specific movements in special Kre-O bricks.

Kre-O Dungeons & Dragons is the sixth Kre-O line, released in January 2014. It is based on the popular role-playing game series of the same name.

In early 2017, Hasbro debuted a new line of product based on the Trolls movie.

References

External links
 Official Website 
 Kreosite - An independent wiki with details of all the Kre-O sets released

2000s toys
2010s toys
Construction toys
Hasbro products
Products introduced in 2011
Transformers (toy line)